Nils Mittmann (born 10 April 1979) is a German professional basketball player.

Career

Mittmann played 14 seasons in the German Basketball Bundesliga for the clubs New Yorker Phantoms Braunschweig, TSK Würzburg, EnBW Ludwigsburg, and Walter Tigers Tübingen. He retired from full-time professional basketball in 2014, but continues to play for the Weißenhorn Youngstars in the third-tier ProB.

References

External links
Beko-bbl.de Profile
Nils Mittmann at Basketball-Reference.com

1979 births
Living people
Basketball Löwen Braunschweig players
German men's basketball players
Riesen Ludwigsburg players
Power forwards (basketball)
Ratiopharm Ulm players
Small forwards
Sportspeople from Braunschweig
Tigers Tübingen players